XHCY-FM is a radio station in Huejutla de Reyes, Hidalgo, broadcasting on 90.9 FM.

History
XHCY began as XECY-AM 1320, later moving to 930. It was the first radio station in the region, owned by José Pinto Meneses and coming to air in 1968. In 1977, Pinto Meneses sold the concession to Isabel Flores Vera.

In 2012, XECY signed on its FM station, with the AM shut down in 2015.

References

Radio stations in Hidalgo (state)
Radio stations established in 1968